The green longtail (Urolais epichlorus) is a bird species of the family Cisticolidae, in the monotypic genus Urolais. It is found in the Cameroon line (including Bioko). Its natural habitats are subtropical or tropical moist montane forest and dry savanna.

References

Ryan, Peter (2006). Family Cisticolidae (Cisticolas and allies). pp. 378–492 in del Hoyo J., Elliott A. & Christie D.A. (2006) Handbook of the Birds of the World. Volume 11. Old World Flycatchers to Old World Warblers'' Lynx Edicions, Barcelona 

green longtail
Birds of the Gulf of Guinea
Birds of Central Africa
green longtail
Taxonomy articles created by Polbot